N'Gara may refer to:

 N'Garadougou, Koulikoro Region, Mali
N'Gara, Ségou, Mali